ICU is a Kyiv-based financial group that includes three business areas: trading, investment banking and asset management.
The group is owned by its top management. ICU's managing directors are Makar Pasenyuk and Konstantin Stetsenko. 
During 2007–2014 the group's chairwoman was Valeriya Hontareva, who left its position to serve as a head of the National Bank of Ukraine. In 2013 bank Avangard also joined ICU Group.

According to actual information of the bank, the former minister for energy and coal industry of Ukraine, V. Demchychin, holds approximately 10% of the ICU holding.

Money on a $10 million project gave the British Hedge Fund Autonomy Capital Research LLP.

Structure 
The ICU HOLDINGS LIMITED includes such companies:

 LLC "Assets Management Company "Investment Capital Ukraine"" (Ukraine)
 Investment Capital Ukraine LLC (Ukraine)
 Westal Holdings Ltd (Cyprus)
 PJSC "Bank Avangard" (Ukraine)
 ZNPF "Investment Capital - Bond Fund"
 ZNPF "Investment Capital - Action Fund"
 PIF "Investment Capital Balanced"
 Open Pension Fund "Dynasty"
 Investment Company "Ludvinovka 31"

Operating activities

Investment banking
Group specializes in debt and equity origination, buy-side and sell-side M&A advisory, financial consulting, debt restructuring. As of 2015 ICU has completed the transaction for the restructuring of public and private debt totaling more than US$5.0 billion. ICU has been named as a leading agent for restructuring in 2009-2010 and Ukraine's best investment bank in 2015 by Cbonds financial news agency.

Trading
Company is engaged in trading shares and fixed income. ICU was the first Ukrainian entity to become a leading member of International Swaps and Derivatives Association (ISDA) in September, 2013. Group has a central position on the local stock exchange market. It conduct operations at the Ukraine's main trading facilities – Perspektyva Stock Exchange, PFTS Stock Exchange and Ukrainian Exchange. ICU is a member of a self-regulating organization (SRO) – Association "Ukrainian stock traders".
ICU was chosen to be an official IPO partner of the Warsaw Stock Exchange since 2007.

Asset management
ICU is a leading Ukrainian asset manager with domestic and international operations. Group provides its services to private and institutional investors, both residents and non-residents.
As of July 2015 ICU manages investments of over US$250 million.
Key Funds:
  Investment Capital Bond Fund – Ukrainian public funds that invest in fixed income instruments;
  CIS Opportunities Fund – foreign fund that invests in the securities markets of the CIS;
  Global Strategy Fund – foreign fund with the focus on global markets.
Investment Capital Bond Fund is known for its high yield. According to the Investfunds rankings, it has shown 308% growth over the September 2011 - June 2015 period, beating the UX index by 348%.

ICU Business Books 
In the spring of 2015, the financial group launched the publishing project "ICU Business Books" (full name "ICU Business Books for the sake of the future of Ukraine", shortened #Cubooks). The purpose of the project is to increase the level of intellectual discussion in Ukraine, which will contribute to reducing the influence of mystical thinking, cargoults and in general populism in the broad masses of Ukrainian society.

The form of implementation of the project - the publication of Non-Fikshn literature, mainly business books and economics, which, according to ICU, deserve attention of the broad reader audience of Ukraine. As of 30.03.2020 in a series #ICUbooks came eleven books.

Among them are such bestsellers as:

 Why Nations Fail: The Origins of Power, Prosperity, and Poverty - Daron Acemoglu and James Robinson.  
 Zero to One! Notes about Startup - Peter Thiel.  
 Plutocrats. The era of new rich and decline of the old system - Chrystia Freeland.    
 Capital in the Twenty-First Century - Thomas Piketty.    
 Talking to my daughter about the economy - Yanis Varofakis.    
 The Euro and the Battle of Ideas -  Markus Brunnermeier, Harold James and Jean-Pierre Landau.    
 Blockchain Revolution: How the Technology Behind Bitcoin Is Changing Money, Business, and the World - Alex Tapscott and Don Tapscott.

Avangard Bank

PJSC "BANK AVANGARD" was registered by the National Bank of Ukraine on July 5, 2013. In accordance with the bank license #269, General license on conducting exchange operations #269 (dated September 2, 2013) and Annex thereto, the Bank offers a wide range of banking services and products and focuses its main activity on the forex market, money market and stock market, carrying out operations at the expense of both its own funds and the clients’ funds.
On July 17, 2014, Credit-Rating, a nationally recognized credit rating agency in Ukraine, has confirmed its long-term credit rating of uaA, stableoutlook.

According to the actual financial statement of 31 December 2015,  the bank serves just 228 accounts of 98 customers with 23 employees!

Government officials who worked in ICU 
Investment Capital Ukraine worked people who work in public positions in Ukraine since 2014:

 Gontareva Valery  - Chairman of the National Bank of Ukraine.
 Demchyshyn Volodymyr  - Minister of Energy and Coal Industry of Ukraine in the Second Yatsenyuk Government.
 Vovk Dmytro - a temporary executor of the head of the National Commission for State Regulation of Energy and Public Utilities.
 Pilovsky Oleksandr - Chairman of the National Commission, which carries out state regulation in the field of communication and informatization.
 Bars Yevgen - First Deputy Chairman of Ukravtodor.

Selected awards
 2013–2014 – The Best Government Bond Trader by the Number of Transactions by Perspektyva Stock Exchange
 2009–2011, 2015 – The best Sales in Ukraine by Cbonds.
 2013 – The Best Analytics (3rd place) by Thomson Reuters
 2012 – The Best Asset Management Company by World Finance
 2012 – The Best Multi-Strategy Income Fund (2nd place) by Bloomberg

References

External links 
 ICU
 ICU's management
 ICU's awards
 Hontareva resigned as Chairwoman of the Board

Investment management companies of Ukraine
Companies based in Kyiv
Ukrainian companies established in 2006